The Sammarinese People's Party (PPS) was a Christian democratic political party in San Marino, forerunner of the current Sammarinese Christian Democratic Party, and counterpart of the Italian People's Party.

History 
The PPS was founded in December 1919 by Egisto Morri, Carlo Balsimelli and some socially engaged priests. The party was backed by Pope Benedict XV to oppose the Sammarinese Socialist Party, after the abrogation of ancient non expedit act. During midsummer 1920, the PPS organized some farmers' strikes and called for general elections, which took place on November 14, 1920, with a new party-list proportional electoral system: it was a narrow victory, the party obtaining 29 of the 60 seats, two ones under the absolute majority, but the revolutionary, and finally self-disruptive, political line of the Socialists, which abandoned the Grand and General Council to organize continuous strikes, left the Populars alone against the opposite danger, the rightist Sammarinese Democratic Union which was rapidly leadered by the new-born Sammarinese Fascist Party.

During the general election of 1923, the PPS was involved into the Fascist-leadered Patrotic Bloc trying to mitigate this list: it was a vain intent, Benito Mussolini's agents yet working to lead the small republic toward a dictatorship. The PPS was finally disbanded by the Fascists in 1925, few days after the closure of the PPI in Italy.

References 

Political parties established in 1919
Political parties disestablished in 1925
Defunct political parties in San Marino
Christian democratic parties in Europe
Catholic political parties
1919 establishments in San Marino
1925 disestablishments in San Marino